The 1931 Caltech Engineers football team was an American football team that represented the California Institute of Technology in the Southern California Conference (SCC) during the 1931 college football season. In their 11th season under head coach Fox Stanton, the team compiled a 6–2–1 record, won the SCC championship, and outscored all opponents by a total of 122 to 53.

Halfback George "Red" Watson was the team captain. Watson was also selected by the conference coaches as a first-team player on the All-SCC team.  Guard Phil Craig and end Ed Hayes were named to the second team. Other players included halfback Jack De Milita and tackle Bill Shuler (son of the noted radio personality "Fighting Bob" Shuler).

Schedule

References

Caltech
Caltech Beavers football seasons
Southern California Intercollegiate Athletic Conference football champion seasons
Caltech Engineers football